William Marlin (born 21 October 1950) is a Sint Maarten politician who served as the 3rd Prime Minister of Sint Maarten from 2015 to 2017. Marlin was the leader of the National Alliance, and was the leader of the First and Second Marlin cabinet.

Resignation 
In November 2017, a motion of no confidence against Marlin and some other ministers was accepted in Parliament, due to Marlin's position in the negotiation with the Dutch government about anti fraud measures and aid funds in the aftermath of Hurricane Irma. While Marlin did tender the resignation of the cabinet, he refused to immediately step aside after a second motion of no confidence was accepted, and an instruction by the Dutch Kingdom Council of Ministers was required to force Marlin out while the rest of the cabinet would continue as caretaker cabinet until the elections.

References

See also
 List of Sint Maarten leaders of government

Living people
1950 births
Prime Ministers of Sint Maarten
Presidents of the Parliament of Sint Maarten
Members of the Parliament of Sint Maarten
National Alliance (Sint Maarten) politicians